The following is a timeline of the history of the municipality of Ghent, Belgium.

Prior to 19th century

 941 - Origins of the crypt of what became St Bavo's Cathedral.
 1274/1300 - Origins of the choir of what became St Bavo's Cathedral.
 1336 - Tapestry-weavers' guild established.
 1380
 Belfry of Ghent built.
 Public clock installed (approximate date).
 1432 - Artist Van Eyck paints altarpiece for St. John's Church.
 1448 - "De Fonteine" chamber of rhetoric constituted.
 1480 - Saint Michael's Church built.
 1483 - Printing press in operation.
 1531 - St Bavo's Cathedral built.
 1559 - Roman Catholic Diocese of Ghent established.
 1576 - Pacification of Ghent signed - an alliance of the provinces of the Habsburg Netherlands.
 1584 - Spaniards in power.
 1667 - The oldest Belgian newspaper, the Gazet van Gent was founded. 
 1714 - Formed part of the Austrian Netherlands.
 1771 - Royal Academy of Fine Arts (Ghent) active.
 1794 - Became the capital of the French department of the Scheldt.

19th century
 1814 - Treaty of Ghent signed between the US and the UK.
 1817 - Ghent University established by William I of the Netherlands.
 1827 - Ghent–Terneuzen Canal built.
 1833 -  founded.
 1835 - Royal Conservatory of Ghent founded.
 1841 - Bank of Flanders established.
 1845 - Population: 105,711.
 1861 - Gent-Dampoort railway station opens.
 1866/1867 - A serious outbreak of cholera.
 1874 - Horse-drawn tram begins operating.
 1875 -  opens.
 1879 -  newspaper begins publication.
 1880 
  (cooperative) founded.
 Population: 131,431.
 1881 - Bank of Ghent established.
 1883 - Royal Sport Nautique de Gand rowing club formed.
 1891 - Het Volk newspaper begins publication.
 1895 - Emile Braun becomes mayor.
 1897 - Cluysen - Ter Donck Regatta begins.
 1900
 Ghent system of unemployment benefits introduced.
 K.A.A. Gent football club formed.

20th century

 1902 -  established.
 1904 
 Electric tram begins operating.
 Population: 162,482.
 1912 - Gent-Sint-Pieters railway station and Patria Cinema open.
 1913 - Exposition universelle et internationale (1913) held in city.
 1914 - Vooruit built.
 1919 - Population: 165,655.
 1920 - Jules Ottenstadion (stadium) built.
 1930 - Population: 170,358.
 1942 - Ghent University Library Book Tower built.
 1947 -  becomes mayor.
 1959 - Ghent University Hospital opens.
 1965 - Section of Mendonk becomes part of Ghent.
 1970
 Studio Skoop (cinema) opens.
 Population: 148,860.
 1973 - Gentbrugge railway station built.
 1975 -  opens.
 1976 - Mariakerke becomes part of Ghent.
 1977 - Gentbrugge becomes part of city.
 1980
  founded.
 Population: 241,695.
 1981 - Decascoop (cinema) built.
 1987 - Flanders Expo arena built.
 1995 - Hogeschool Gent (college) established.

21st century

 2006 -  begins.
 2007 - Daniël Termont becomes mayor.
 2010 - Ghent City Museum opens.
 2012 -  hi-rise built.
 2013
 Ghelamco Arena opens.
 Population: 248,242.
 2014 -  built.
 2020 - Ghent University Museum opens.

See also
 Ghent history
 
 List of mayors of Ghent
 Timelines of other municipalities in Belgium: Antwerp, Bruges, Brussels, Leuven, Liège
 History of urban centers in the Low Countries

References

This article incorporates information from the Dutch Wikipedia.

Bibliography

in English
 
 
 
 

 
  (+ 1881 ed.)
 
 
 

in other languages
  1770-

External links

 Europeana. Items related to Ghent, various dates.
 Digital Public Library of America. Items related to Ghent, various dates

 
Ghent
Ghent
Years in Belgium